Roland Greene Usher (January 6, 1823 – March 5, 1895) was a Massachusetts politician who served as the 11th Mayor of Lynn, Massachusetts.

Early life
Usher was born on January 6, 1823 to Eleazer and Fanny (Bucknan) Usher  in Medford, Massachusetts.

Family life
Usher married Carolyn M. Mudge on June 5, 1844, they had four children, Caroline A. Usher;  Abbott L. Usher; Edward P. Usher; Caroline M. Usher. Roland G. Usher, Junior (1880-1957) was his grandson, son of Edward P. Usher.

Civil War service
During the American Civil War, Usher was Paymaster-in-Chief of the Department of the Gulf.

Warden of the Massachusetts State Prison
In 1883 Usher was appointed warden of the Massachusetts state prison by Governor Butler, Usher served as warden until 1886.

Notes

1823 births
People of Massachusetts in the American Civil War
Republican Party members of the Massachusetts House of Representatives
Mayors of Lynn, Massachusetts
1895 deaths
Members of the Massachusetts Governor's Council
19th-century American politicians